Montague Township is a township in Sussex County, in the U.S. state of New Jersey, in the New York City Metropolitan Area. As of the 2020 United States census, the township's population was 3,792, a decrease of 55 (−1.4%) from the 2010 census count of 3,847, which in turn reflected an increase of 435 (+12.7%) from the 3,412 counted in the 2000 census. Montague is also the northernmost municipality in the state of New Jersey.

Most of the area of Montague Township is public lands, primarily High Point State Park, Stokes State Forest, and Delaware Water Gap National Recreation Area.  Montague is known for its scenery and wildlife; summer sports in the area include hiking, biking, camping (both public and private campgrounds are available), and fishing.

The derivation of the township's name is uncertain, though suggestions include that it was named after the George Montagu, 4th Duke of Manchester, as suggested by King George II, who approved the royal patent on March 26, 1759; for Lady Mary Wortley Montagu, an author who was popular at the time; or for solicitor John Montague. Montague was incorporated on February 21, 1798, by an act of the New Jersey Legislature as one of New Jersey's initial group of 104 townships.

The township borders both New York and Pennsylvania, the only municipality in New Jersey to border both states; it is a rural community that does not have any traffic lights. Before Montague Township was granted its own post office in the 1980s, residents had all of their mail delivered through the 12771 ZIP code for Port Jervis, New York, leading to situations where residents had New Jersey driver's licenses with a New York State mailing address.

Geography
According to the United States Census Bureau, the township had a total area of 46.63 square miles (120.77 km2), including 45.23 square miles (117.15 km2) of land and 1.40 square miles (3.62 km2) of water (3.00%).

Unincorporated communities, localities and place names located partially or completely within the township include Brick House, Duttonville, Four Corners, High Point, High Point Park, Lake Marcia, Mashipacong Island, Mashipacong Pond, Millville, and Minisink Island.

The Tri-States Monument marks the northwest end of the New Jersey and New York boundary and the north end of the New Jersey and Pennsylvania boundary. It is also the northernmost point of New Jersey.

Lafayette Township borders the municipalities of Sandyston Township and Wantage Township in Sussex County; and New York State.

In 2019 only about 30% of the land was available for development, as the federal government and the State of New Jersey collectively own 70% or more of the land in the township.

Climate
This climatic region is typified by large seasonal temperature differences, with warm to hot (and often humid) summers and cold (sometimes severely cold) winters.  According to the Köppen Climate Classification system, Montague Township has a humid continental climate, abbreviated "Dfb" on climate maps.

Demographics
{{US Census population
| 1810=  661
| 1820=  964
| 1830=  990
| 1840= 1025
| 1850= 1010
| 1860=  983
| 1870=  932
| 1880= 1022
| 1890=  797
| 1900=  710
| 1910=  621
| 1920=  534
| 1930=  581
| 1940=  621
| 1950=  602
| 1960=  879
| 1970= 1131
| 1980= 2066
| 1990= 2832
| 2000= 3412
| 2010= 3847
| estimate=3803
| estyear=2021
| estref=
| footnote=Population sources:<small> 1810–19201840 1850–1870<ref>Raum, John O. [https://archive.org/details/historyofnewjers01raumj/page/271 The History of New Jersey: From Its Earliest Settlement to the Present Time, Volume 1], p. 271, J. E. Potter and company, 1877. Accessed February 24, 2013. "Montague is the most northern township, bordering on New York and Pennsylvania. It contained in 1850, 1,010 inhabitants; in 1860. 983; and in 1870, 932."</ref> 1850 18701880–1890 1890–1910 1910–19301930–1990 20002010 2020</small>
}}

In 2019 over 50% of the people living in the township first settled in the 1980s and 1990s. Rob Jennings of NJ Advance Media described Montague as racially homogeneous.

Census 2010

The Census Bureau's 2006–2010 American Community Survey showed that (in 2010 inflation-adjusted dollars) median household income was $64,526 (with a margin of error of +/− $9,763) and the median family income was $68,542 (+/− $13,778). Males had a median income of $44,105 (+/− $14,473) versus $33,996 (+/− $5,832) for females. The per capita income for the borough was $26,411 (+/− $2,961). About 7.3% of families and 8.2% of the population were below the poverty line, including 12.6% of those under age 18 and 6.4% of those age 65 or over.

Census 2000

As of the 2000 United States Census there were 3,412 people, 1,286 households, and 910 families residing in the township.  The population density was 77.5 people per square mile (29.9/km2).  There were 1,588 housing units at an average density of 36.1 per square mile (13.9/km2).  The racial makeup of the township was 95.25% White, 1.79% African American, 0.18% Native American, 0.67% Asian, 1.08% from other races, and 1.03% from two or more races. Hispanic or Latino of any race were 3.28% of the population.DP-1: Profile of General Demographic Characteristics: 2000 - Census 2000 Summary File 1 (SF 1) 100-Percent Data for Montague township, Sussex County, New Jersey , United States Census Bureau. Accessed February 24, 2013.

There were 1,286 households, out of which 34.9% had children under the age of 18 living with them, 57.4% were married couples living together, 8.2% had a female householder with no husband present, and 29.2% were non-families. 23.2% of all households were made up of individuals, and 7.5% had someone living alone who was 65 years of age or older. The average household size was 2.65 and the average family size was 3.14.

In the township the population was spread out, with 27.2% under the age of 18, 6.4% from 18 to 24, 31.2% from 25 to 44, 24.1% from 45 to 64, and 11.1% who were 65 years of age or older. The median age was 37 years. For every 100 females, there were 107.0 males. For every 100 females age 18 and over, there were 102.5 males.

The median income for a household in the township was $45,368, and the median income for a family was $50,833. Males had a median income of $39,569 versus $25,221 for females. The per capita income for the township was $20,676. About 8.5% of families and 12.0% of the population were below the poverty line, including 18.1% of those under age 18 and 6.3% of those age 65 or over.

 Economy 
The central business district, which had five gas stations as of 2019, is on New Jersey Route 23. Business at the gas stations declined after a New Jersey tax increase in 2016 since drivers from New Jersey Route 23 had used the stations to get less inexpensive fuel, as fuel in New York State is more expensive.

 Parks and recreation 
According to Richard Innella, who served as mayor, previously a softball team for women in Pennsylvania took Montague Township residents.

 Government 

 Local government 
Montague Township is governed under the Township form of New Jersey municipal government, one of 141 municipalities (of the 564) statewide that use this form, the second-most commonly used form of government in the state. The Township Committee is comprised of five members, who are elected directly by the voters at-large in partisan elections to serve three-year terms of office on a staggered basis, with either one or two seats coming up for election each year as part of the November general election in a three-year cycle."Forms of Municipal Government in New Jersey", p. 7. Rutgers University Center for Government Studies. Accessed June 3, 2015. At an annual reorganization meeting, the Township Committee selects one of its members to serve as Mayor and another as Deputy Mayor, each serving terms of one year.

, members of the Montague Township Committee are Mayor Richard E. Innella (R, term on committee and as mayor ends December 31, 2022), Deputy Mayor George E. Zitone (R, term on committee and as deputy mayor ends 2022), Joseph Krumpfer (R, 2024), James LeDonne (R, 2024) and Fred Merusi (R, 2023).2022 Municipal Data Sheet, Montague Township. Accessed May 5, 2022.Election Summary November 3, 2020 General Election Official Amended Results, Sussex County, New Jersey, updated December 10, 2020. Accessed January 1, 2021.

 Federal, state and county representation 
Montague Township is located in the 5th Congressional District and is part of New Jersey's 24th state legislative district.2019 New Jersey Citizen's Guide to Government, New Jersey League of Women Voters. Accessed October 30, 2019.

 

Sussex County is governed by a Board of County Commissioners whose five members are elected at-large in partisan elections on a staggered basis, with either one or two seats coming up for election each year. At an annual reorganization meeting held in the beginning of January, the board selects a Commissioner Director and Deputy Director from among its members, with day-to-day supervision of the operation of the county delegated to a County Administrator. , Sussex County's Commissioners are 
Commissioner Director Anthony Fasano (R, Hopatcong, term as commissioner and as commissioner director ends December 31, 2022), 
Deputy Director Chris Carney (R, Frankford Township, term as commissioner ends 2024; term as deputy director ends 2022), 
Dawn Fantasia (R, Franklin, 2024), 
Jill Space (R, Wantage Township, 2022; appointed to serve an unexpired term) and 
Herbert Yardley (R, Stillwater Township, 2023).Board of County Commissioners, Sussex County, New Jersey. Accessed May 1, 2022. In May 2022, Jill Space was appointed to fill the seat expiring in December 2022 that had been held by Sylvia Petillo until she resigned from office.

Constitutional officers elected on a countywide basis are 
County Clerk Jeffrey M. Parrott (R, Wantage Township, 2026),
Sheriff Michael F. Strada (R, Hampton Township, 2022) and 
Surrogate Gary R. Chiusano (R, Frankford Township, 2023). The County Administrator is Gregory V. Poff II, whose appointment expires in 2025.Sussex County Official Directory 2021, Sussex County, New Jersey. Accessed May 1, 2022.

Politics

Jennings described the township as leaning towards conservative politics.

As of March 23, 2011, there were a total of 2,448 registered voters in Montague Township, of which 328 (13.4% vs. 16.5% countywide) were registered as Democrats, 1,247 (50.9% vs. 39.3%) were registered as Republicans and 870 (35.5% vs. 44.1%) were registered as Unaffiliated. There were 3 voters registered as Libertarians or Greens. Among the township's 2010 Census population, 63.6% (vs. 65.8% in Sussex County) were registered to vote, including 82.4% of those ages 18 and over (vs. 86.5% countywide).GCT-P7: Selected Age Groups: 2010 - State -- County Subdivision; 2010 Census Summary File 1 for New Jersey , United States Census Bureau. Accessed February 24, 2013.

In the 2012 presidential election, Republican Mitt Romney received 1,001 votes (63.6% vs. 59.4% countywide), ahead of Democrat Barack Obama with 530 votes (33.7% vs. 38.2%) and other candidates with 39 votes (2.5% vs. 2.1%), among the 1,575 ballots cast by the township's 2,426 registered voters, for a turnout of 64.9% (vs. 68.3% in Sussex County). In the 2008 presidential election, Republican John McCain received 1,150 votes (63.9% vs. 59.2% countywide), ahead of Democrat Barack Obama with 592 votes (32.9% vs. 38.7%) and other candidates with 35 votes (1.9% vs. 1.5%), among the 1,799 ballots cast by the township's 2,421 registered voters, for a turnout of 74.3% (vs. 76.9% in Sussex County). In the 2004 presidential election, Republican George W. Bush received 1,072 votes (68.5% vs. 63.9% countywide), ahead of Democrat John Kerry with 466 votes (29.8% vs. 34.4%) and other candidates with 20 votes (1.3% vs. 1.3%), among the 1,564 ballots cast by the township's 2,072 registered voters, for a turnout of 75.5% (vs. 77.7% in the whole county).

In the 2013 gubernatorial election, Republican Chris Christie received 74.6% of the vote (750 cast), ahead of Democrat Barbara Buono with 21.8% (219 votes), and other candidates with 3.7% (37 votes), among the 1,015 ballots cast by the township's 2,446 registered voters (9 ballots were spoiled), for a turnout of 41.5%. In the 2009 gubernatorial election, Republican Chris Christie received 832 votes (68.6% vs. 63.3% countywide), ahead of Democrat Jon Corzine with 243 votes (20.0% vs. 25.7%), Independent Chris Daggett with 103 votes (8.5% vs. 9.1%) and other candidates with 22 votes (1.8% vs. 1.3%), among the 1,212 ballots cast by the township's 2,402 registered voters, yielding a 50.5% turnout (vs. 52.3% in the county).

 Education 
Students in public school for pre-kindergarten through eighth grade attend the Montague Township School District.School Performance Reports for the Montague Township School District, New Jersey Department of Education. Accessed July 26, 2022. As of the 2020–21 school year, the district, comprised of one school, had an enrollment of 247 students and 20.0 classroom teachers (on an FTE basis), for a student–teacher ratio of 12.4:1.

Public school students in ninth through twelfth grades attend High Point Regional High School. As of the 2020–21 school year, the high school had an enrollment of 841 students and 74.0 classroom teachers (on an FTE basis), for a student–teacher ratio of 11.4:1. They may enroll at Sussex County Technical School, which accepts students on a selective basis, and to the middle school charter program in Sparta Township.

Tim Capone, the superintendent of the Montague district, stated that in 2019 there were to be more Montague students attending Sussex Technical than High Point Regional.  Additionally as of 2014 some Montague high school students use the New Jersey interdistrict choice program to attend Kittatinny Regional High School. The report "Montague Township School District High School Route Evaluation" stated that 85 Montague Township students went to High Point Regional and nine attended Port Jervis High.

Prior to September 2014, Montague Township district sent students across state lines to attend middle school and high school at Port Jervis Middle School and Port Jervis High School, of the Port Jervis City School District, in nearby Port Jervis, New York. - On the Montague School District site. Use CTRL-A to see all text. That month Montague Township's high school students began attending High Point Regional High, in a shift from Port Jervis that was to take four years to complete. High Point also serves students from Branchville Borough, Frankford Township, Lafayette Township, Sussex Borough and Wantage Township (where the school is located).2015-16 School Profile, High Point Regional High School. Accessed June 8, 2016. "Located 63 miles northwest of Manhattan in bucolic Sussex, County NJ, High Point serves students from six municipalities: Branchville, Lafayette, Frankford, Montague, Sussex, and Wantage." As of the 2018–19 school year, the high school had an enrollment of 893 students and 81.9 classroom teachers (on an FTE basis), for a student–teacher ratio of 10.9:1. The district expanded to covering middle school with students designated to attend Montague Township School for grades 7–8 instead of Port Jervis Middle effective fall 2016.

 Infrastructure 
The United States Postal Service established a post office in 1980. Prior to that year the post came from Port Jervis, New York with a 12771 zip code, giving the residents New York mailing addresses.

Transportation
 there are no traffic lights in the town.

One U.S., state, and major county route each traverses the township. U.S. Route 206 passes through in the western part and crosses the Delaware River at the Milford-Montague Toll Bridge. Route 23 passes through the eastern part and serves as the entrance road to High Point State Park and ends at the New York border just south of Interstate 84. County Route 521 enters Montague concurrent with US 206, separates from US 206 just south of the Milford-Montague Toll Bridge, then heads northeast through the northwest portion of the township before ending at the New York state boundary.

The closest limited access road is Interstate 84 and is immediately over the state line in Deerpark, New York.

In the northernmost section of the township along Route 23, there are several gasoline stations, most likely because gas had historically been significantly less expensive in New Jersey than in Matamoras, Pennsylvania or Port Jervis, New York.

Notable people

People who were born in, residents of, or otherwise closely associated with Montague Township include:

 Ed Banach (born 1960), athlete who won a gold medal in Freestyle Wrestling in the 198-pound-weight (heavyweight) class at the 1984 Summer Olympics in Los Angeles
 Lou Banach (born 1960), athlete who won a gold medal in Freestyle Wrestling in the 220-pound-weight (heavyweight) class at the 1984 Summer Olympics in Los Angeles
 John Westbrook Hornbeck (1804–1848), Whig Party member of the United States House of Representatives from Pennsylvania from 1847 to 1848
 Daniel Myers Van Auken (1826–1908), was a Democratic member of the U.S. House of Representatives from Pennsylvania from 1867 to 1871
 Kinuyo Yamashita, video game music composer and sound producer best known for her soundtrack for Konami's Castlevania Paul Zindel (1936–2003), playwright, young adult novelist, and educator who wrote The Effect of Gamma Rays on Man-in-the-Moon Marigolds''.

Wineries
 Westfall Winery - Now defunct. Replaced with a farm animal sanctuary

References

External links

Montague Township website
Montague Township School District

School Data for the Montague Township School District, National Center for Education Statistics

 
1759 establishments in New Jersey
Delaware Water Gap National Recreation Area
Papakating Creek watershed
Populated places established in 1759
Township form of New Jersey government
Townships in Sussex County, New Jersey
New Jersey populated places on the Delaware River